Mher Khachatryan (born November 3, 1983) is a New York-based Armenian painter. His artwork has been published in several prestigious magazines and newspapers. His art also has been shown in area galleries across the world and private collections in Armenia, Russia, and the U.S. Mher's work also can be found in Armenian national gallery, the work "My Angel" is dedicated to the 100th anniversary of the Armenian Genocide. He is the founder and CEO of Art To Thank and also a founder of the Cre8 Art School. Mher has won several awards and he is a member of the Artists' Union of Armenia.

Early life
Mher was born on November 3, 1983 in Armenia. His early interest was in drawing. He studied in an art college, and he spent three years in Academy of Fine Arts in Armenia, completing his formal art training, Mher received his BFA in drawing and painting at the Art college of Panos Terlemezyan, and MFA at the Academy Of Fine Arts in Yerevan, Armenia.

Career
He started to show his art in area galleries including Ico Gallery in Chelsea, New York, NY, Hanna Gallery in NJ, Narekatsy gallery in Armenia, Webster Hall in New York, Vulcan’s Forge MO. Mher is the founder of the Art To Thank, an NGO which donates the painted portraits to the Veterans, wounded warriors and the families of deceased soldiers.

Awards and Achievements
2018: 
 The Two-Dimensional Public Vote Award winner in ArtPrize

See also
 List of Armenian painters
 Karapet Yeghiazaryan
 Karen Smbatyan

References

External links
 

Living people
1983 births
American male painters
American portrait painters
Painters from New York City